Vice-Admiral Robert Earl Douglas George CMM, CD (born 6 October 1940) is a retired officer of the Canadian Forces. He was the 22nd Commander Maritime Command from 1 August 1989 to 12 July 1991.

Career
George joined the Royal Canadian Navy in 1961. He became Commanding Officer of the destroyer  in 1974, Senior staff Officer (Combat Systems Readiness) in 1976 and Commanding Officer of the destroyer  in 1977. He went on to be Commander of the Second Canadian Destroyer Squadron in 1982, Director General of Maritime Doctrine and Operations at the National Defence Headquarters in 1984 and Commander Maritime Forces Pacific in 1987. After that he became Commander Maritime Command in 1989, in which role he despatched the supply ship  to the Persian Gulf during the Gulf War, before becoming Deputy Chief of the Defence Staff from 1991 and Canadian Military Representative to the NATO Military Committee in 1992 and then retiring.

Awards and decorations
George's personal awards and decorations include the following:

References

Canadian admirals
Living people
Royal Canadian Navy officers
Commanders of the Order of Military Merit (Canada)
1940 births

Commanders of the Royal Canadian Navy
People from Prince Albert, Saskatchewan
Canadian military personnel from Saskatchewan